Refik Osman Top (born Refik Osman, 1 January 1897 – 26 April 1957), known by his nickname Şiir –literally meaning the Poem–, was a Turkish footballer, referee, coach and sports columnist. Top is one of the most decorated players in the early decades of Turkish football, winning the Istanbul Football League both as a player and manager. He is also the first footballer to play for the Big Three clubs of Turkey.

Top is also a prominent figure in the history of Beşiktaş J.K., being one of the founders and initial players of football department and the first international footballer to represent Turkey.

Career

Playing career

Scoring twice, Top had become the first scorer ever of Beşiktaş–Galatasaray rivalry, at Istanbul Football League encounter held on 22 August 1924 at Taksim Stadium. He represented Turkey once on 16 November 1924 against Soviet Union, in a friendly game held at Imeni Vorovskogo Stadium, ended 3–0 for home side. This appearance made him the first Beşiktaş J.K. player ever to play for national team.

Refereeing
Top arbitrated 18 games between 1927 and 1945 in Istanbul Football League and Milli Küme.

Coaching career
Top managed Beşiktaş for two tenures. During his first stint, he earned 5 consecutive titles at Istanbul Football League between 1938 and 1943.

Honours

Player
Galatasaray
Istanbul Football League (1): 1914–15
Beşiktaş
Istanbul Football League (1): 1923–24

Coach
Beşiktaş
Istanbul Football League (5): 1938–39, 1939–40, 1940–41, 1941–42, 1942–43

References

Bibliography
 Books

External links
 Profile at TFF 

1897 births
1967 deaths
Footballers from Istanbul
Turkey international footballers
Turkish football managers
Association football midfielders
Altınordu F.K. players
Beşiktaş J.K. footballers
Galatasaray S.K. footballers
Fenerbahçe S.K. footballers
Beşiktaş J.K. managers
Süper Lig players
Süper Lig managers